Westmoor Flag railway station was a private station to the west of Mansel Lacy, Herefordshire, England. The station was opened in 1863 and may have closed prior to the line closure in 1962.

References

Further reading

Disused railway stations in Herefordshire
Railway stations in Great Britain opened in 1863
Railway stations in Great Britain closed in 1962
Former Midland Railway stations
Former private railway stations